During the 1925–26 English football season, Brentford competed in the Football League Third Division South and finished in 18th place, conceding a club record 94 goals.

Season summary

Brentford manager Fred Halliday overhauled the club's squad during the 1925 off-season, with all but seven players being released. Despite running a deficit of £6,000 (equivalent to £ in ), the board of directors pledged a "substantial sum of money" for the transfer of quality players and in came new goalkeeper John Thomson, four full backs, four half backs and new forwards Bill Finlayson and Bert Young. The club's colours were changed to the now-traditional red-and-white stripes, black shorts and black socks.

9 defeats from the opening 10 matches of the season left Brentford rooted to the bottom of the Third Division South and forward Reginald Parker (one of the club's highest scorers during the previous two seasons) elected to transfer to South Shields. Griffin Park was closed by the Football League for the first and only time due to crowd disturbance during a 6–1 thrashing at the hands of Brighton & Hove Albion on 12 September 1925. The ground was reopened 14 days later. The poor run ended with the first victory of the season on 17 October, 2–1 over Bristol Rovers. Five wins in the following seven matches lifted the Bees out of the re-election places, with forwards Jack Lane, Bill Finlayson and full back Percival Whitton (who had been deployed up front by manager Halliday) all coming into form, with half back Alex Graham converting a number of penalties.

By 20 February 1926, a run of just five defeats in 19 matches lifted Brentford to 13th in the table. The signing of forward Ernie Watkins from Southend United for a then-club record fee of £1,000 in January 1928 proved to be money well-spent, with Watkins scoring 11 goals in his first 12 matches, including a hat-trick in the Bees' biggest victory of the season, 5–1 versus Norwich City on 2 April. The Bees' form petered out in the final two months of the season, winning just 3 of the final 12 matches to finish 18th with the worst defensive record in the division. The 94 goals conceded during the 1925–26 season is a club record.

League table

Results
Brentford's goal tally listed first.

Legend

Football League Third Division South

FA Cup

 Sources: Statto, 11v11, 100 Years Of Brentford

Playing squad 
Players' ages are as of the opening day of the 1925–26 season.

 Sources: Timeless Bees, Football League Players' Records 1888 to 1939, 100 Years Of Brentford

Coaching staff

Statistics

Appearances and goals

Players listed in italics left the club mid-season.
Source: 100 Years of Brentford

Goalscorers 

Players listed in italics left the club mid-season.
Source: 100 Years of Brentford

Management

Summary

Transfers & loans 
Cricketers are not included in this list.

References 

Brentford F.C. seasons
Brentford